Pettiona is a surname. Notable people with the surname include:

 Cecil Pettiona (1906–1987), Australian rules footballer
 Charlie Pettiona (1913–1946), Australian rules footballer
 Robert Pettiona (1915–1980), Australian politician